The 2011 Pan-American Volleyball Cup was the tenth edition of the annual women's volleyball tournament, played by twelve countries over July 1–9, 2011 in Ciudad Juárez, Chihuahua, Mexico. The top four NORCECA teams and the top two from CSV confederation, qualified for the 2012 FIVB World Grand Prix.

Competing nations

Squads

Preliminary round

Group A

Group B

Final round

Championship bracket

5th–10th places bracket

Eleventh place match

Classification 7–10

Quarterfinals

Ninth place match

Classification 5–8

Semifinals

Seventh place match

Fifth place match

Third place match

Final

Final standing

Brazil, Dominican Republic, the United States, Cuba, Puerto Rico and Argentina qualified for the 2012 FIVB World Grand Prix.

Individual awards

Most Valuable Player

Best Scorer

Best Spiker

Best Blocker

Best Server

Best Digger

Best Setter

Best Receiver

Best Libero

References

External links
 

Women's Pan-American Volleyball Cup
Pan-American Volleyball Cup
V
Volleyball
2011 in Mexican women's sports